Out Stealing Horses is a 2003 Norwegian novel by Per Petterson. It was translated into English in 2005 by Anne Born, published in the UK that year, and in the US in 2007. Among other awards it won the 2007 Dublin IMPAC Award, one of the richest literary prizes in the world.

Out Stealing Horses has double meanings and features two sets of twins. When asked “How did the Nazi Occupation of Norway translate into the plot of your novel?” Mr. Petterson responded “Well, like I said, I do not plan, so that double meaning came up when I needed it. That is disappointing to some readers, I know. But for me it shows the strength of art. It is like carving out a sculpture from some material. You have to go with the quality of the material and not force upon it a form that it will not yield to anyway. That will only look awkward. Early in the book, in the 1948 part, I let the two fathers (of my main characters, Jon and Trond) have a problem with looking at each other. And I wondered, why is that? So I thought, well, it’s 1948, only three years after the Germans left Norway. It has to be something with the war. And then I thought, shit, I have to write about the war. You see, I hate research.”

Cast

People
 Barkald – The owner of a nearby farm with horses.  “The biggest landowner in the district.”
 Ellen Sander – Trond's eldest daughter.
 Franz – Trond's father's friend who lives near the cottage.
 Jon Haug – Trond's friend in the summer of 1948.  He is 15 years old that summer.
 Lars Haug – Younger brother of Jon's and the twin of Odd.  He is 10 years old in the summer of 1948.  Also, Trond's neighbor in the later episode.
 Odd Haug – Younger brother of Jon's and the twin of Lars.  He is 10 years old in the summer of 1948.
 Jon's father
 Jon's mother
 Olav – The mechanic in the later episode.
 The Dairy Maid - Works on a dairy near the cottage.
 Trond Tobias Sander – The story's narrator and main character.  He is 15 years old in the summer of 1948.  He is 67 in the later episode.
 Trond's father
 Trond's mother
 Uncle Arne – A brother of Trond's mother.  A twin of Uncle Amund.
 Uncle Amund – A brother of Trond's mother.  A twin of Uncle Arne.

Animals
 Bramina – The Haug's horse, mentioned in 1944 and in the summer of 1948.
 Brona – Barkald's horse that he loans to Trond's father for helping with his hay making.
 Lyra – Trond's dog in the later episode.
 Poker – Lars’ dog in the later episode.
 Jakob - Name for fish that Trond's father uses.

Plot timeline

The events in this story are revealed to the reader out of chronological order.  The following is a reconstruction of the timeline of the events in the story.

 April 9, 1940 – The Germans arrive in Oslo. “Not long after”, Trond's father went away for the first time.
 1942 – Trond's father meets Franz and moves into a vacant cabin owned by Barkald.  He uses the cabin for two years.
 1943 – Uncle Arne is shot and killed by the Germans when he tries to escape from a police station somewhere in Sørlandet, the southernmost part of Norway.
 Autumn, 1944 – The Germans detect Jon's mother with the man in her boat, Franz blows up the bridge, the Germans shoot and kill the man, and Trond's father and Jon's mother flee to Sweden together.
 1945 – The Germans leave Norway.
 June 1945 – Trond's father returns to his family's home in Oslo.
 The summer of 1948 – 
 Mid June – Trond and his father go to the cottage for the summer.
 Two days before “one of the first days of July” – Jon's mother goes to Innbygda.
 The next day – Lars accidentally shoots and kills his twin brother Odd with Jon's gun.  Their father goes to get their mother and brings her home from Innbygda.
 The next day – Trond and Jon go out stealing horses, and Jon takes an egg from a goldcrest nest and drops it on the ground.
 Three days later – Odd's funeral.
 “A few days after the funeral” – Jon leaves for Innbygda on the bus.  He is then “at sea”.
 A few weeks later, Jon's father breaks his leg and injures his shoulder.  He is taken to the Innbygda hospital.  He never returns home.
 A few days later - Trond's father borrows 2 horses from Barkald and he and Trond ride through the forest and camp for the night. During the trip they find some of the timber caught on a snag in the river and through Trond's efforts are able to free it.
 “The day that summer was over” – Trond's father puts Trond on the bus to Elverum.  Trond then takes the train to Oslo.  That is the last time Trond sees his father.
 Late Summer and Autumn of 1948 – 
 Trond rides his bicycle to the train station every day hoping to meet his father on an inbound train. After several weeks of this he gives up and stops going.
 Trond's father writes his family that he is not coming home any more and that there is money for the timber felled that summer in the Warmlandsbank in Karlstad.
 Trond's mother borrows money from Uncle Amound to travel to Karlstad.
 Trond and his mother travel by train to Karlstad, get the money from the Warmlandsbank, and buy Trond a suit.
 1957 – 
 Jon returns home to take over the farm.  He is 24.
 Lars leaves home on his 20th birthday.
 Later – 
 Trond marries and has two children who are grown and have children themselves by 1999.
 Trond marries a second wife.
 1996 – 
 Trond's second wife dies in an auto accident that Trond only just survives himself.  
 Trond's sister dies of cancer within one month of Trond's wife's death.
 Some time after the accident – Trond “pensions himself off”.
 1999 – 
 Trond's two children are grown and have children themselves.
 Autumn – Trond lives alone “in a small house in the far east of Norway”.
 “Early November” – Trond meets his nearest neighbor who is out looking for his dog. The neighbor turns out to be Lars.  Soon thereafter Lars comes to his house for dinner and they acknowledge that they know each other from the summer of 1948. The next day a large tree in Trond's front yard falls over in a storm and Lars helps him cut it into firewood.
 Ellen visits Trond in his home.

Critical reaction
In the original language the novel won the Norwegian Booksellers' Prize, and in English (translation by Anne Born) it won the Independent Foreign Fiction Prize and the 2007 Dublin IMPAC Award, one of the richest literary prizes in the world. Time magazine's Lev Grossman named it one of the Top 10 Fiction Books of 2007, ranking it at #4, and praising it as a "page-turner". It was shortlisted for the 2008 Best Translated Book Award.

See also
 2003 in literature
 Norwegian literature

References

External links
Out Stealing Horses at complete review.
Out Stealing Horses by Thomas McGuane in The New York Times, June 24, 2007
Out Stealing Horses by Paul Binding in The Independent November 6, 2005

2003 novels
Forlaget Oktober books
21st-century Norwegian novels
Novels by Per Petterson
Novels set in Norway
Novels set during World War II
Nonlinear narrative novels